Ribeira Afonso is a village on the eastern coast of São Tomé Island in São Tomé and Príncipe. Its population is 1,621 (2008 est.). It is 4 km southwest of Água Izé and 16 km south of the capital São Tomé.

Population history

References

Populated places in Cantagalo District
Populated coastal places in São Tomé and Príncipe